Peter Blake, born John Beattie Dempsey (8 December 1948 – 21 July 2018) was a Scottish actor. Probably best known as the character Kirk St Moritz in the BBC sitcom Dear John, by John Sullivan, his other high-profile moments came through his playing of a 'Fonz'-type character in Pepsi-Cola commercials which led to a hit record in 1977 "Lipsmackin' Rock 'n' Rollin", Andy Evol the disc-jockey in Agony with Maureen Lipman for LWT and in an episode of Taggart ("Do or Die") as Sgt. Bill Kent.  He also had a long association with The Rocky Horror Show playing Frank-N-Furter over a thousand times between 1975 and 1994.

Early life
Peter Blake was born John Beattie Dempsey on 8 December 1948 in Selkirk, Scotland. He was always referred to by his parents as Ian, the Scottish Gaelic term for John.

He began his career as an aspiring pop star before turning to acting; his first professional appearance was at the Edinburgh International Festival, in Frank Dunlop's 'Pop Theatre''' production of The Winter's Tale, at the Assembly Hall, in 1966.

Theatre
Peter Blake trained at the Royal Scottish Academy of Music and Drama and joined the Citizens' Theatre Company, performing in a production of Twelfth Night, and Michael Blakemore's original production of Bertolt Brecht's The Resistible Rise of Arturo Ui which opened in September 1967 at the Citizens' Theatre, Glasgow and, in August 1968, performed at The Lyceum, Edinburgh as part of the Edinburgh Festival.

After graduating in 1969 Peter worked briefly as a stage manager in several Soho strip clubs before he joined the international cast of Victor Spinetti's Amsterdam production of Hair, in 1970, and subsequently played the role of Berger in the show's national tour of The Netherlands.

Returning to the UK there followed a string of London's West End rock musicals, with roles in Hair at the Shaftesbury Theatre; as Pharaoh in the original productions of Joseph and the Amazing Technicolor Dreamcoat at the Albery Theatre, as Pontius Pilate in Jesus Christ Superstar at the Palace Theatre; as Frank-N-Furter in The Rocky Horror Show at the King's Road Theatre; as Peter in the revue What’s a Nice Country like US doing in a State like This? at the May Fair Theatre; and reprising his role of Frank-N-Furter at the Comedy Theatre.

Peter Blake has also performed at the Chichester Festival Theatre, work included Julius Caesar, Murder in the Cathedral and In Order of Appearance; out of London theatre work included Nestor in Irma La Douce at the Sheffield Crucible; Count Dracula in Charles McKeown's play Dracula at the Thorndike Theatre, Leatherhead; Marat in The Promise at the Churchill Theatre, Bromley; and on tour in Jack Rosenthal's Smash!; Alan Ayckbourn's Absent Friends, Ray Cooney's Funny Money, and The Rocky Horror Show returning to his old role of 'Frank-N-Furter' in 1992 and 1994; he also starred in several pantomimes, including as Captain Hook in Peter Pan, as King Rat in Dick Whittington and as Abanazer in Aladdin.

Television and film
Peter Blake's best-known role was the flamboyant and boastful Kirk St Moritz, resplendent in white suit, big collars and golden medallion, in the British sitcom Dear John (1986–87). He appeared in other British television series including as Tony Miller, a member of CI5 in the hard-hitting police drama The Professionals (1978). As Michael Vincent in Penmarric (1979), Andy Evol in Agony (1979-1981), Dr Courant in Praying Mantis (1982), Carl Pierce in A Very Peculiar Practice (1986), Aubrey Owen in Dogfood Dan & the Carmarthen Cowboy (1988), David in Split Ends (1989), as Harvey in Fiddlers Three (1991) and as Ken Tate in EastEnders (2010).

Blake guested on shows such as The Squirrels, Out, Z-Cars, Minder, Shoestring, Shine on Harvey Moon, Bergerac, After Henry, Alas Smith and Jones, Ever Decreasing Circles, Boon, The New Statesman, Woof!, Underbelly, The High Life, The Bill, and Casualty, among others.

His film appearances include Intimate Games (1976), Panic (1978), Murder on Line One (1989), Cash in Hand (1998), The Lift (2008) and Man and Dog (2010).

 Discography 
In 1977, Peter Blake reached number 40 in the UK Singles Chart with the song Lipsmackin' Rock 'n' Rollin, performing it on the BBC Television music show Top of the Pops on 29 September 1977; and subsequently released a single called Boogie Breakout'' in 1979.

 Lipsmackin' Rock 'N Rollin' / Clever Dick - Released : 26 August 1977.
 Boogie Breakout / Rock 'N' Roll Lady - Released : 9 March 1979.
Stage Cast Recordings include :
 Hair - The American Tribal Love-Rock Musical (Original Amsterdam Cast) - LP.Date of release: 1970.Written-By – Galt MacDermot, Gerome Ragni, James Rado.
 London production of the musical, "What's a Nice Country like U.S. Doing in a State like This?"Date of release: 1976.Music by Cary Hoffman. Words by Ira Gasman.
 Hard Times: The Musical (Original London Cast Recording Highlights) - EP.Date of release: 1 Jun 2000.Book, music and lyrics by Christopher Tookey and Hugh Thomas. From the novel by Charles Dickens.

Theatre credits

References

External links

Obituary - Peter Blake, The Herald

1948 births
2018 deaths
People from Selkirk, Scottish Borders
Scottish male television actors
People educated at Selkirk High School